Ronald Murdoch (born 28 December 1945) is a New Zealand former cricketer. He played six first-class matches for Otago between 1964 and 1965.

See also
 List of Otago representative cricketers

References

External links
 

1945 births
Living people
New Zealand cricketers
Otago cricketers
Cricketers from Dunedin